Horror vacui can refer to:

Horror vacui (art), a concept in art approximately translated from Latin fear of empty spaces 
Horror vacui (physics), a physical postulate
Horror Vacui (film), a 1984 German satirical film
Horror Vacui (album), by Linea 77
Horror Vacui, a composition by Jonny Greenwood